Bhodwal Majri is a village in Panipat district of Haryana, India. It is situated between the Grand Trunk Road and the Ambala-Delhi main railway line, near the town of Samalkha.

Nirankari Adopted Village 
In accordance with the vision of Satguru Baba Hardev Singh Ji Maharaj Ji Village Bhodwal Majri (Samalkha Dist) was adopted on February 23, 2017.

Education

School's Bhodwal Majri
 GHSS Bhodwal Majri,
 GPS Bhodwal Majri 
 Geeta Sr. Sec. School, 
 KR Vidhya Mandir

Colleges near Bhodwal Majri
 Panipat Institute of Engineering & Technology (PIET)

Religious sites in the village

 Shiv Mandir

 Baba Kali Singh

 Mata Mandir

 Hanumaan Ji Mandir

 Pathri Wali Mata

 Baba Kali Singh

 Baba Bhuri Singh

 Goga Medhi Mandir

Station in Bhodwal Majri 
Bhodwal Majri village has a Railway Station Named Bhodwal Majri whose station code is BDMJ
Bhodwal Majri Train Time Table .

Historic palace
Freedom Fighter Dalbir Singh Smadhi

Gallery
[[File:Shiv Mandir Bhodwal Majri Panipat.jpg|thumb|532x532px|Shiv Mandir Bhodwal Majri]]

References 

Panipat
Villages in Panipat district